Luke Reeves (born 2 May 1980) is an Australian born English cricketer.  Reeves is a right-handed batsman who plays primarily as a wicketkeeper.  He was born at Adelaide, South Australia.

Reeves played for the Leicestershire Cricket Board in three List A matches.  These came against the Durham Cricket Board in the 2000 NatWest Trophy, the Warwickshire Cricket Board in the 2001 Cheltenham & Gloucester Trophy and the Northamptonshire Cricket Board in the 1st round of the 2002 Cheltenham & Gloucester Trophy which were played in 2001.

In his three List A matches, he scored 6 runs at a batting average of 3.00, with a high score of 5.  In the field he took a single catch.  Reeves did not keep wicket in any of these matches.

He currently plays club cricket for Ashford Town Cricket Club in the Kent Cricket League.

References

External links

1980 births
Living people
Cricketers from Adelaide
Cricketers from South Australia
British people of Australian descent
English cricketers
Leicestershire Cricket Board cricketers